Elliott Jordan (born 22 April 1983) is an English actor best known for playing Callum Monks in the BBC drama EastEnders and Jack in the ITV comedy drama Benidorm.

Career 

Jordan started acting at The Sylvia Young Theatre School then joined the National Youth Theatre.

He has appeared in numerous television programs, including Father Brown, Casualty, Silk, My Family, Waking the Dead, Holby Blue, The Inspector Lynley Mysteries, Sea of Souls, The Bill and Murphy's Law and Benidorm (TV Series)

Jordan also played the ex-boyfriend in Lily Allen's music video "Smile".

On 26 June 2008, it was revealed that Elliott would be joining the famous BBC soap opera EastEnders, as Vinnie Monks' long-lost son, Callum. He revealed in an interview that his peer mentor when he arrived was Jake Wood. Executive Producer Diederick Santer added: "Callum – played by the very talented and striking Elliott Jordan – will bring a breath of fresh air to Walford. Bright, twinkly, and with the gift of the gab, he'll get the women of Walford all of a flutter."  On 20 January 2009 it was announced that Jordan would be leaving EastEnders; he made his final appearance in March 2009.

Jordan appeared in the second series of the ITV comedy Benidorm, playing Jack, a young lad who catches his eye on Janice and they start a fling together. He reprised this role for the 2009 one-hour Special when he interrupted Madge and Mel's wedding. He appeared once again as Jack for Benidorm series five in 2012 and series 6 in 2014.

In 2013 he appeared in Family Tree, a HBO mockumentary-style television comedy directed by Christopher Guest.

Filmography

Television

Film

Music Video

Stage

Ste, Beautiful Thing, Nottingham Playhouse , 2002
Terry, Mercy, Soho Theatre, 2004
Davey, Vincent River, Landor Theatre, 2010

Personal life
Elliott and his wife Olivia were married in September 2017 on the Isle of Wight.

References

External links 
 

1983 births
English male soap opera actors
Living people
National Youth Theatre members